The New Hampshire presidential primary is the first in a series of nationwide party primary elections and the second party contest (the first being the Iowa caucuses) held in the United States every four years as part of the process of choosing the delegates to the Democratic and Republican national conventions which choose the party nominees for the presidential elections to be held the subsequent November. Although only a few delegates are chosen in the New Hampshire primary, its real importance comes from the massive media coverage it receives (along with the first caucus in Iowa). Spurred by the events of the 1968 election, reforms that began with the 1972 election elevated the two states' importance to the overall election, and began to receive as much media attention as all of the other state contests combined. Examples of this extraordinary coverage have been seen on the campuses of Dartmouth College and Saint Anselm College, as the colleges have held multiple national debates and have attracted media outlets like NPR, Fox News, CNN, NBC, and ABC. The publicity and momentum can be enormous from a decisive win by a frontrunner, or better-than-expected result in the New Hampshire primary. The upset or weak showing by a front-runner changes the calculus of national politics in a matter of hours, as happened in 1952 (D), 1968 (D), 1980 (R), and 2008 (D).

Since 1952, the primary has been a major testing ground for candidates for both the Republican and Democratic nominations. Candidates who do poorly frequently drop out, while lesser-known, underfunded candidates who excel in New Hampshire can become serious contenders, garnering large amounts of media attention and campaign funding.

Crucially, the New Hampshire primary is not a "closed primary", where voter participation is limited by voters' past or recent party registration. Instead, New Hampshire enables any voter who has been undeclared, or re-registers as undeclared (not registered with any party) to vote in either party's primary. Candidates who do well in the state are seen as having a strong appeal to independents—who account for as much as 41% of the electorate. A strong performance in New Hampshire is seen as a bellwether for how well a candidate can do in a general election, given their appeal to less partisan voters who sometimes flood that party's primary, if they want to participate at all. This system is not a fully open primary, because people who are registered with a party (Republican or Democratic) on voting day cannot vote in the other party's primary.

Timing
New Hampshire state law stipulates that the presidential primary shall be on the second Tuesday in March (the date when town meetings and non-partisan municipal elections are traditionally held), but that the Secretary of State must, if necessary, change the date to ensure that the New Hampshire primary will take place at least seven days before any "similar election" in any other state. The Iowa caucuses are not considered to be a similar election. In recent election cycles, the New Hampshire primary has taken place the week after the Iowa caucus.

The community of Dixville Notch traditionally opens its polling place in the ballroom of The Balsams Grand Resort Hotel at midnight, usually in front of a crowd of journalists, where the village's handful of voters cast their ballots before the polls close about less than ten minutes later. This has led many presidential candidates to visit the area before the New Hampshire primary in hopes of securing an early-morning boost. However, a fire burned down the hotel, and now the vote takes place in a small lodge beside the lot where the hotel formerly stood.

New Hampshire's first-in-the-nation primary status was threatened in 2007, when both the Republican and Democratic National Committees moved to give more populous states a bigger influence in the presidential race.

Several states also sought to move up the dates of their 2008 primaries in order to have more influence and dilute the power of the New Hampshire primary. Originally held in March, the date of the New Hampshire primary has been moved up repeatedly to maintain its status as first. The 2008 primary was held on January 8.

Significance
There is consensus among scholars and pundits that the New Hampshire primary, because of the timing and the vast media attention, can have a great impact and may even make, break or revive a candidate. Controlling for other factors statistically, a win in New Hampshire increases a candidate's share of the final primary count in all states by 27 percentage points.

Since 1977, New Hampshire has fought hard to keep its timing as the first primary (while Iowa has the first caucus a few days sooner). State law requires that its primary must be the first in the nation (it had been the first by tradition since 1920). As a result, the state has moved its primary earlier in the year to remain the first. The primary was held on the following dates: 1952–1968, second Tuesday in March; 1972, first Tuesday in March; 1976–1984, fourth Tuesday in February; 1988–1996, third Tuesday in February; 2000, first Tuesday in February (February 1); 2004, fourth Tuesday in January (January 27). The shifts have been to compete with changing primary dates in other states. The primary dates for 2008 (January 8) and 2012 (January 10) continued the trend - they were held the second Tuesday in January both years.

Before the Iowa caucus first received national attention in the 1970s (Republicans began caucusing in Iowa in 1976), the New Hampshire primary was the first binding indication of which presidential candidate would receive the party nomination. In defense of their primary, voters of New Hampshire have tended to downplay the importance of the Iowa caucus. "The people of Iowa pick corn, the people of New Hampshire pick presidents," said then-Governor John H. Sununu in 1988.

Since then, the primary has been considered an early measurement of the national attitude toward the candidates for nomination. Unlike a caucus, the primary measures the number of votes each candidate received directly, rather than through precinct delegates. The popular vote gives lesser-known candidates a chance to demonstrate their appeal to the electorate at large.

Unlike most other states, New Hampshire permits voters who have not declared their party affiliation to vote in a party's primary. Voters do not have to officially join a specific political party before voting. Voters can change their affiliation back to "Undeclared" immediately after voting, affiliating with a party only while casting a ballot. Voters who are already registered members of a political party cannot change their affiliation at the polling place; that can only be done before the checklist is closed several weeks prior to the election. New voters can, however, register at the polling place. All voting is done with paper ballots; however, most of the paper ballots are counted by machine.

New Hampshire's status as the first in the nation is somewhat controversial because the ethnic makeup of the state is not diverse and not representative of the country's voters. This is shown in the 2010 Census data, with the percentage of minority residents being nearly five times smaller than the national average (New Hampshire is 92% non-Hispanic white, versus 64% nationally). Politically however, the state does offer a wide sampling of different types of voters. Although it is a New England state, it is not as liberal as some of its neighbors. For example, according to one exit poll, of those who participated in the 2004 Democratic primary, 4-in-10 voters were independents, and just over 50% said they considered themselves "liberal". Additionally, as of 2002, 25.6% of New Hampshire residents are registered Democrats and 36.7% are Republicans, with 37.7% of New Hampshire voters registered as "undeclared" independents. Also, New Hampshire was the only state in the Northeast to vote for George W. Bush in 2000. This plurality of independents is a major reason why New Hampshire is considered a swing state in general U.S. presidential elections.

Recently, media expectations for the New Hampshire primary have come to be almost as important as the results themselves; meeting or beating expectations can provide a candidate with national attention, often leading to an infusion of donations to a campaign that has spent most of its reserves. For example, in 1992, Bill Clinton, although he did not win, did surprisingly well, with his team dubbing him the "Comeback Kid"; the extra media attention helped his campaign's visibility in later primaries.

New Hampshire's political importance as the first-in-the-nation primary state is highlighted in the documentary film Winning New Hampshire. The film focuses on John Kerry's comeback in 2004 and the decisive effect of the New Hampshire primary on the presidential selection process.

The most recent presidential election winner to win the New Hampshire primary was Donald Trump in 2016, while the three presidents before him (Bill Clinton, George W. Bush and Barack Obama) finished second in the New Hampshire primary before later being elected to the presidency, and the previous four before that won the New Hampshire primary.

History

New Hampshire has held a presidential primary since 1916 and started the tradition of being the first presidential primary in the United States starting in 1920. Until 1948, the New Hampshire primary, like most of the small number of other primaries in the country, listed only the names of local citizens who wanted to be delegates to the state convention. In 1948, Richard F. Upton, speaker of the New Hampshire House of Representatives decided to make the primary "more interesting and meaningful…so there would be a greater turnout at the polls." The state legislature passed a law allowing citizens to vote directly for the presidential candidates. Any candidate could get on the ballot if he submitted fifty supporting petitions from each of the two congressional districts, and voters could choose delegates who were explicitly pledged to a particular candidate.

New Hampshire did not begin to assume its current importance until 1952. In that year, Dwight D. Eisenhower demonstrated his broad voter appeal by defeating Robert A. Taft, "Mr. Republican", who had been favored for the nomination, and Estes Kefauver defeated incumbent President Harry S. Truman, leading Truman to abandon his campaign for a second term of his own. The other president to be forced out of the running for re-election by New Hampshire voters was Lyndon Johnson, who, as a write-in candidate, managed only a 49-42 percent victory over Eugene McCarthy in 1968 (and won fewer delegates than McCarthy), and consequently withdrew from the race.

The winner in New Hampshire has not always gone on to win their party's nomination, as demonstrated by Republicans Leonard Wood in 1920, Harold Stassen in 1948, Henry Cabot Lodge, Jr. as a write-in candidate in 1964, Pat Buchanan in 1996, and John McCain in 2000, and Democrats Estes Kefauver in 1952 and 1956, Paul Tsongas in 1992, Hillary Clinton in 2008, and Bernie Sanders in 2016 and 2020.

From 1952 to 1988, the person elected president had always carried the primary, but Bill Clinton broke the pattern in 1992, as did George W. Bush in 2000, Barack Obama in 2008, and Joe Biden in 2020. In 1992, Clinton lost to Paul Tsongas in New Hampshire; in 2000, George W. Bush lost to John McCain in New Hampshire; in 2008 Barack Obama lost to Hillary Clinton; and in 2020 Joe Biden lost to Bernie Sanders.

1968
In November 1967, Eugene McCarthy declared, "there comes a time when an honorable man simply has to raise the flag" and entered the New Hampshire Democratic primary. On March 12, 1968, McCarthy, who was the only candidate on the ballot, came within 7 percentage points of defeating President Lyndon Johnson, a write-in candidate who was technically still exploring his candidacy and had not bothered to file. Just a few days later, on March 16, 1968, Robert F. Kennedy entered the race for President. Johnson subsequently withdrew from the election with this Shermanesque statement: “I shall not seek, and I will not accept, the nomination of my party for another term as your president.”

One minor candidate in the Republican primary was William W. Evans, Jr., a former New Jersey State Assemblyman, who received just 151 votes statewide.

The 1968 New Hampshire Democratic primary was one of the crucial events in the politics of that landmark year in United States history. Senator Eugene McCarthy began his campaign with a poem that he wrote in imitation of the poet Robert Lowell, “Are you running with me Jesus”:

1992

Bill Clinton was able to declare himself the "Comeback Kid" after posting a surprise second-place finish behind Paul Tsongas in the Democratic primary. Clinton's support had been flagging for weeks since being hit by allegations of infidelity with actress Gennifer Flowers. On the Republican side, Pat Buchanan garnered an unexpected 37% showing behind incumbent President George H. W. Bush. Buchanan did not win a single state, but revealed some doubts about the moderate president among conservative voters.

2000

George W. Bush's campaign, which for months had dominated in polling, money and endorsements on the Republican side, suffered a blow when John McCain, who had been surging in late polls, ended up beating the governor in the Granite State by more than 18 points. The result forecast a tough two-man race for the GOP nomination, which would carry on until Super Tuesday in March. Al Gore helped himself with a narrow win in the Democratic primary, which somewhat assuaged his supporters' concerns about Bill Bradley's insurgent campaign.

2004

Senator John Kerry secured a decisive victory with 35% of the vote, 10 percentage points more than second-place finisher Howard Dean.

2008

Hillary Clinton managed an upset win over Barack Obama in New Hampshire, despite polls showing her as much as 13 points behind in the run-up to the vote. The win helped Clinton get back some of the momentum she lost the week before when Obama carried the Iowa caucuses—though Obama did eventually win the Democratic nomination. John McCain won the Republican primary, sparking an unexpected comeback for the senator whose long-shot campaign had been written off as a lost cause months before. He went on to win the GOP nomination.

2016

Bernie Sanders defeated Hillary Clinton by 22 percentage points. Sanders amassed 152,193 votes in total, earning him 15 delegates, while Clinton managed 95,252 votes with 9 delegates. Together with Donald Trump's double-digit win in the GOP race, the primary results revealed voter frustrations with mainstream "establishment" politicians.

2020

Bernie Sanders narrowly placed first in the Democratic primary once again, edging out former Mayor of South Bend Pete Buttigieg with 76,384 votes to 72,454. Incumbent President Donald Trump won an overwhelming victory in the Republican primary with 129,734 votes, beating former Governor of Massachusetts Bill Weld by over 75 percentage points and receiving the most votes in the New Hampshire primary for an incumbent candidate in U.S. history, breaking Bill Clinton's 1996 record of 76,797.

Democratic results
Notes: An asterisk indicates a write-in candidate. Candidates in bold won the primary. Candidates in italics were incumbent presidents.
1916: Six of the eight delegates elected were pledged to President Woodrow Wilson, the other two were unpledged
1920: Of the eight delegates elected three were pledged to former U.S. Food Administrator Herbert Hoover; the rest were unpledged
1924: All delegate candidates ran unpledged
1928: All delegate candidates ran unpledged
1932: All delegates and alternates elected were pledged to Governor Franklin D. Roosevelt
1936: All delegates and alternates elected were pledged to President Roosevelt
1940: All delegates and alternates were pledged to President Roosevelt
1944: All delegates elected were pledged to President Franklin D. Roosevelt
1948: All delegates elected (except for one alternate) were pledged to President Harry Truman
1952 (March 11): Estes Kefauver (55%), Harry Truman (44%), and others (1%)
1956 (March 13): Estes Kefauver (85%) and Adlai Stevenson (15%)
1960 (March 8): John F. Kennedy (85%), Paul C. Fisher (13%), and others (2%)
1964 (March 10): Lyndon B. Johnson (95%), Robert F. Kennedy (2%) and others (3%)
1968 (March 12): Lyndon B. Johnson* (50%), Eugene McCarthy (42%), Richard Nixon (5%), and others (3%)
1972 (March 7): Edmund Muskie (46%), George McGovern (37%), Sam Yorty (6%), Wilbur Mills (4%), Vance Hartke (3%), and others (4%)
1976 (February 24): Jimmy Carter (29%), Mo Udall (23%), Birch Bayh (15%), Fred R. Harris (11%), Sargent Shriver (8%), and others (14%)
1980 (February 26): Jimmy Carter (48%), Ted Kennedy (38%), Jerry Brown (10%), and others (4%)
1984 (February 28): Gary Hart (39%), Walter Mondale (29%), John Glenn (12%), Jesse Jackson (6%), George McGovern (5%), Ronald Reagan (5%), and Fritz Hollings (4%)
1988 (February 16): Michael Dukakis  (36%), Dick Gephardt (20%), Paul Simon (17%), Jesse Jackson (8%), Al Gore (7%), Bruce Babbitt (5%), Gary Hart (4%), and others (3%)
1992 (February 18): Paul Tsongas (33%), Bill Clinton (25%), Bob Kerrey (11%), Tom Harkin (10%), Jerry Brown (8%), and others (13%)
1996 (February 20): Bill Clinton (84%), Pat Buchanan* (4%), and others (12%) 
2000 (February 1): Al Gore (50%), Bill Bradley (46%), and others (4%)
2004 (January 27): John Kerry (38%), Howard Dean (26%), Wesley K. Clark (12%), John Edwards (12%), Joseph I. Lieberman (9%), Dennis J. Kucinich (1%), and others (2%) 
2008 (January 8): Hillary Clinton (39%), Barack Obama (36%), John Edwards (17%), Bill Richardson (5%), Dennis Kucinich  (1%), and others (2%)
2012 (January 10): Barack Obama (81%) and others (19%)
2016 (February 9): Bernie Sanders (60%), Hillary Clinton (38%), and others (2%)
2020 (February 11): Bernie Sanders (26%), Pete Buttigieg (24%), Amy Klobuchar (20%), Elizabeth Warren (9%), Joe Biden (8%), Tom Steyer (4%), Tulsi Gabbard (3%), Andrew Yang (3%), and others (3%)

Republican results
Notes: An asterisk indicates a write-in candidate. Candidates in bold won the primary. Candidates in italics were incumbent presidents.
1916: Of the eight delegates elected only one was formally pledged (to former President Theodore Roosevelt)
1920: All eight elected delegates were pledged to General Leonard Wood; one of the defeated delegates had been pledged to Governor Hiram Johnson
1924: All delegate candidates ran unpledged
1928: All delegate candidates ran unpledged
1932: All delegates and alternates elected were pledged to President Herbert Hoover
1936: All delegates and alternates were unpledged
1940: All eight delegates elected (and all alternates) were unpledged
1944: Two of the 11 delegates elected were pledged to Governor Thomas E. Dewey, the rest were unpledged
1948: Of the eight delegates elected, two were pledged to Governor Dewey, the remainder were unpledged; four of the alternate delegates were also pledged to Governor Dewey
1952 (March 11): Dwight D. Eisenhower (56%), Robert A. Taft (31%), Harold E. Stassen (8%), Douglas MacArthur (4%), and others (1%)
1956 (March 13): Dwight D. Eisenhower (94%) and others (6%). Of the more than 57,000 GOP votes cast, only 600 were not for Eisenhower.
1960 (March 8): Richard Nixon (89%), Nelson Rockefeller (4%), and others (7%)
1964 (March 10): Henry Cabot Lodge, Jr.* (36%), Barry Goldwater (22%), Nelson Rockefeller (22%), Richard Nixon (17%), and others (3%)
1968 (March 12): Richard Nixon (78%), Nelson Rockefeller (11%), Eugene McCarthy (5%), Lyndon B. Johnson (2%), George Romney (2%), and others (2%)
1972 (March 7): Richard Nixon (68%), Pete McCloskey (20%), John M. Ashbrook (10%), and others (2%)
1976 (February 24): Gerald Ford (50%), Ronald Reagan (49%), and others (1%)
1980 (February 26): Ronald Reagan (50%), George H. W. Bush (23%), Howard Baker (13%), John B. Anderson (10%), Phil Crane (2%), and John Connally (2%)
1984 (February 28): Ronald Reagan (86%), Gary Hart (5%), Harold Stassen (2%), and others (7%)
1988 (February 16): George H. W. Bush (38%), Bob Dole (28%), Jack Kemp (13%), Pierre S. "Pete" du Pont IV (10%), Pat Robertson (9%), and others (2%)
1992 (February 18): George H. W. Bush (53%), Pat Buchanan (38%), and others (9%)
1996 (February 20): Pat Buchanan (27%), Bob Dole (26%), Lamar Alexander (23%), Steve Forbes, Jr. (12%), Richard G. "Dick" Lugar (5%), Alan Keyes (3%), Morry Taylor (1%), and others (3%)
2000 (February 1): John McCain (49%), George W. Bush (30%), Steve Forbes, Jr. (13%), Alan Keyes (6%), and others (2%)
2004 (January 27): George W. Bush (81%) and others (19%)
2008 (January 8): John McCain (37%), Mitt Romney (32%), Mike Huckabee (11%), Rudy Giuliani (8%), Ron Paul (8%), Fred Thompson (1%), and others (3%)
2012 (January 10): Mitt Romney (39%), Ron Paul (23%), Jon Huntsman, Jr. (17%), Rick Santorum (9%), Newt Gingrich (9%), and others (3%)
2016 (February 9): Donald Trump (35%), John Kasich (16%), Ted Cruz (12%), Jeb Bush (11%), Marco Rubio (11%), Chris Christie (7%), Carly Fiorina (4%), Ben Carson (2%), and others (2%)
2020 (February 11): Donald Trump (86%), Bill Weld (9%), and others (5%)

Libertarian results

Vice-presidential results
A Vice-presidential preference primary was also formerly held at the New Hampshire primary. New Hampshire State Senator Jack Barnes, who won the 2008 Republican contest, co-sponsored a bill in 2009 which would eliminate the Vice-presidential preference ballot. The bill passed both houses of the state legislature and took effect in 2012.

The only time a non-incumbent won the Vice-presidential primary and then went on to be formally nominated by his or her party was in 2004, when Democratic U.S. Senator John Edwards won as a write-in candidate. Edwards, who was running for President at the time, did not actively solicit Vice-presidential votes.

In 1968, the sitting Vice President Hubert Humphrey won the Democratic Vice-presidential primary, and then later won the Presidential nomination after the sitting President Lyndon B. Johnson dropped out of the race.

The following candidates received the greatest number of votes at each election.

* - write-in candidate

Sources: New Hampshire Department of State, New Hampshire Political Library

See also

 United States presidential primary
 United States presidential election
 United States presidential election debates
 United States presidential nominating convention
 Electoral College (United States)

Early votes:
 Ames Straw Poll, Iowa, on a Saturday in August prior to the election year, since 1979
 Iowa caucuses, first official election-year event since 1972

Reform plans:
 United States presidential primary reform proposals
 Graduated Random Presidential Primary System
 Delaware Plan
 Rotating Regional Primary System
 Interregional Primary Plan
 National Primary

Notes

References
 New Hampshire presidential election statistics at CountingTheVotes.com
 Winning New Hampshire, a film on the history and significance of the NH Primary, 2004
 The New Hampshire Political Library
 2004 primary results (CNN)
 2000 primary results (CNN)
 
 Local coverage of the primary from The Telegraph of Nashua, NH.
 Local coverage of the primary from The Keene Sentinel of Keene, NH.
 Social Media coverage of the New Hampshire by the Creepy Sleepy podcast
 Radio Row Coverage of the New Hampshire Primary by the Talk Radio News Service and Ellen Ratner
 Germond, Jack. "A Cold, Hard Look", Washingtonian, January 1, 2008. Retrieved on 2008-01-09.

External links
 Booknotes interview with Dayton Duncan on Grass Roots: One Year in the Life of the New Hampshire Presidential Primary, March 31, 1991